Iolaus apatosa is a butterfly in the family Lycaenidae. It is found along the coast of Kenya and the northern coast of Tanzania. The habitat consists of open forests and moist savanna.

The larvae feed on Helixanthera species, including H. kirkii.

References

Butterflies described in 1952
Iolaus (butterfly)